Daciana Hosu (born 16 January 1998) is a Romanian handball player for SCM Râmnicu Vâlcea. 

As a junior, she finished fourth in the 2015 European Youth Championship.

International honours
EHF Cup:
Semifinalist: 2016

References
 

 

1998 births
Living people
Sportspeople from Bistrița
Romanian female handball players
21st-century Romanian women